The Conservative Chronicle is a weekly newspaper featuring nationally syndicated columnists and cartoonists who comment on world events and politics from a conservative point of view. From David Limbaugh to Phyllis Schafly, Ann Coulter and George Will, the Conservative Chronicle presents a variety of conservative critiques and insight in a weekly publication. The Conservative Chronicle also highlights over 25 nationally syndicated political cartoonists (like Bill DeOre, Dick Wright and Mike Ramirez).

External links 
 

Newspapers published in Iowa